David Brian Rimington (born May 22, 1960) is a former American college and professional football player who was a center in the National Football League (NFL) for seven seasons during the 1980s. Rimington played college football for the University of Nebraska, where he was two-time consensus All-American and received several awards recognizing him as the best college lineman in the country. He was selected in the first round of the 1983 NFL Draft and played professionally for the Cincinnati Bengals and Philadelphia Eagles of the NFL. Rimington is the namesake of the Rimington Trophy, which is awarded annually to the nation's top collegiate center.

College career
Rimington attended the University of Nebraska, where he was a consensus First-team All-America in 1981 and 1982. In 1981, he was named the UPI Big Eight Player-of-the-Year and the AP Big Eight Offensive Player of the Year, the only time in Big Eight Conference history that a lineman was so honored. In 1982, he was the Big Eight (all sports) Athlete of the Year and UPI National Lineman of the year. In 1983 he was an NCAA Top Five winner.

Rimington won the Outland Trophy, given to the nation's top interior offensive or defensive lineman, in 1981 and 1982 and is the only two-time winner of the award. He also won the Lombardi Award in 1982, and placed fifth in the balloting for the Heisman Trophy that same year. He and Orlando Pace are the only three-time winners in the Outland/Lombardi category. Rimington is one of only thirteen players in NCAA history have won both of these awards.

Rimington's #50 jersey was retired by Nebraska in 1982. In 1994, he was named to the FWAA 1969-1994 All-America Team, one of just twenty-five athletes named to that team. He was inducted into the College Football Hall of Fame in 1997. He was selected to the Nebraska All-Century Football Team via fan poll in 1999, and named to the All-Century Nebraska football team by Gannett News Service. In 2002, he was named to the Athlon Sports Nebraska All-Time Team. He was named to the Orange Bowl's 75th Anniversary All-Time Team in 2008.

Rimington was a first-team academic All-American in 1981 and 1982. In 2004, he was inducted into the CoSIDA Academic All-America Hall of Fame.

Collegiate all-century teams
In 1999, Rimington was selected as the starting offensive center by Sports Illustrated in their "NCAA Football All-Century Team", and was also selected as the starting offensive center to the Walter Camp Football Foundation All Century Team. Rimington is the only center named to both the Sports Illustrated and Walter Camp All-Century teams.

Professional career
Rimington was selected in the first round of the 1983 NFL Draft by the Cincinnati Bengals. He played five seasons with the Bengals and two with the Philadelphia Eagles before retiring at the end of the 1989 NFL season.

Rimington Trophy
The Rimington Trophy is named in his honor and since 2000 has been given annually to the nation's top collegiate center. The sculptor of the Rimington Trophy is Marc Mellon, who is also the sculptor of the NBA MVP Trophy.

Personal
Following his professional career, Rimington has served with the Boomer Esiason Foundation in their fight against cystic fibrosis. He has been with the foundation since 1993 and has been president since 1995.

Rimington briefly served as the interim athletic director of Nebraska from September 26, 2017, to October 23, 2017, when the former AD Bill Moos was named to the position.

Rimington is a member of Lambda Chi Alpha.

References

External links
 Nebraska profile
 Boomer Esiason Foundation profile
 Rimington Trophy profile
 Rimington's Lost Lettermen blog

1960 births
Living people
American football centers
Cincinnati Bengals players
Nebraska Cornhuskers football players
Philadelphia Eagles players
All-American college football players
College Football Hall of Fame inductees
Sportspeople from Omaha, Nebraska
Players of American football from Nebraska
Nebraska Cornhuskers athletic directors
Ed Block Courage Award recipients